Zloch or Złoch is a surname of Czech and Polish-language origin. It may refer to:

 František Zloch (born 1949), Czech solar observer
 Paul Zorner (born Paul Zloch, 1920–2014), German fighter pilot
 William J. Zloch (born 1944), American judge

See also
 

Czech-language surnames
Polish-language surnames